Wangfujing Station is a station on Line 1 and Line 8 of the Beijing Subway. The main exit is at the south end of Wangfujing shopping street.

Station Layout 
Both the line 1 and line 8 stations have island platforms.

Exits 
There are three exits, lettered A, B, and C. Exits B and C are accessible.

References

External links
 

Railway stations in China opened in 1999
Beijing Subway stations in Dongcheng District